These are the Billboard magazine Hot Dance Airplay number one hits of 2004. Note that Billboard publishes charts with an issue date approximately 7–10 days in advance.

See also
2004 in music
List of number-one dance singles of 2004 (U.S.)
List of Hot 100 number-one singles of 2004 (U.S.)

References

United States Dance Airplay
2004